Jeremias Wigger (born 10 March 1965) is a Swiss cross-country skier who competed from 1988 to 1998. His best finish at the Winter Olympics was fourth in the 4 x 10 km at the 1988 Winter Olympics in Calgary and 13th in the 10 km + 15 km combined pursuit at the 1994 Winter Olympics in Lillehammer.

Wigger's best finish at the FIS Nordic World Ski Championships was 19th in the 50 km event at Thunder Bay, Ontario in 1995. His best World Cup finish was 12th in a 30 km event in Italy in 1990.

He is the father of cross-country skier Siri Wigger.

Cross-country skiing results
All results are sourced from the International Ski Federation (FIS).

Olympic Games

World Championships

World Cup

Season standings

Team podiums
 1 podium

References

External links

Olympic 4 x 10 km relay results: 1936-2002 

1965 births
Living people
Cross-country skiers at the 1988 Winter Olympics
Cross-country skiers at the 1992 Winter Olympics
Cross-country skiers at the 1994 Winter Olympics
Cross-country skiers at the 1998 Winter Olympics
Olympic cross-country skiers of Switzerland
Swiss male cross-country skiers
Sportspeople from the canton of Lucerne